Qaleh Sorkh (also Romanized as Qal‘eh Sorkh; also known as Ghal‘eh Sorkh) is a village in Ashayer Rural District, in the Central District of Fereydunshahr County, Isfahan Province, Iran. At the 2006 census, its population was 1,241 in 263 families.

References 

Populated places in Fereydunshahr County